Li Qiangbing (born 30 April 1985) is a female Chinese-born table tennis player who now represents Austria.

She competed at the 2008 Summer Olympics, reaching the fourth round of the singles competition. She also competed in the team competition.  She competed in the same events at the 2012 Summer Olympics, reaching the third round of the singles competition.

She was born in Beijing.

References

2008 Olympic profile

1985 births
Living people
Austrian female table tennis players
Table tennis players at the 2008 Summer Olympics
Table tennis players at the 2012 Summer Olympics
Table tennis players at the 2016 Summer Olympics
Olympic table tennis players of Austria
Chinese emigrants to Austria
European Games competitors for Austria
Table tennis players at the 2015 European Games
Table tennis players from Beijing
Naturalised table tennis players
Naturalised citizens of Austria
Austrian sportspeople of Chinese descent